The following is a list of notable architects.

17th &18th century architects

19th century

 Henry Irwin
 Samuel Swinton Jacob
 Frederick William Stevens
 Charles Wyatt
 Edwin Lutyens
 Herbert Baker

20th and 21st centuries

 Laurie Baker
 I. M. Kadri
 Claude Batley 
 Christopher Charles Benninger
 Eulie Chowdhury
 Charles Correa
 Hafeez Contractor
 B. V. Doshi
 Nari Gandhi
 Satish Gujral
 Krishnarao Jaisim
 Shimul Javeri Kadri
 Achyut Kanvinde
 Anupama Kundoo
 Anil Laul
 Pravina Mehta 
 Rahul Mehrotra
 Piloo Mody
 Prem Nath
 Eugene Pandala
 Bimal Patel
 Sangeet Sharma
 Shashi Prabhu
 Sheila Sri Prakash
 Raj Rewal
 Kamal Sagar
 G.Shankar
 Joseph Allen Stein
 V. Ganapati Sthapati
 Chitra Vishwanath
 Brinda Somaya
 Amit Khanna
 Bruno Souza
 Gerard da Cunha

See also

 Architecture of India
 List of architects

Indian
Architects